"The Game" is a song by American heavy metal band Disturbed. It was released on 20 February 2001, as the fourth single from the band's debut album The Sickness, and has remained a live staple since. The song is playable on Rock Band and was featured in the movie Dragon Ball Z: Cooler's Revenge.

Personnel
David Draiman – vocals
Dan Donegan – guitar, electronics
Steve Kmak – bass guitar
Mike Wengren – drums, percussion, programming
Johnny K – producer, engineer
Andy Wallace – mixer
Howie Weinberg – mastering

Chart positions

References

2001 singles
2000 songs
Disturbed (band) songs
Songs written by Dan Donegan
Songs written by David Draiman
Songs written by Mike Wengren
Song recordings produced by Johnny K
Giant Records (Warner) singles